Dasumia amoena is a spider species found in Eastern Europe and Russia.

See also 
 List of Dysderidae species

References

External links 

Dysderidae
Spiders of Europe
Spiders of Russia
Spiders described in 1897